Dentons is the largest multinational law firm in the world. Dentons was ranked as the world's 4th-largest law firm by revenue, with $2.9B gross revenue by Global 200 ranking in the fiscal year 2021. The firm is called Dentons in all languages other than Chinese, in which it is called 大成 (Dacheng).  
 
Dentons was founded in March 2013 by the merger of SNR Denton, Fraser Milner Casgrain and Salans. Following its merger with Chinese law firm Dacheng in November 2015, Dentons became the largest law firm in the world by number of lawyers and has the most offices of any law firm in the world, covering every continent.

As of 2020, Dentons operates in 77 countries and has 190 offices. The firm has no headquarters, although the firm's senior leadership are primarily based in Beijing, London and Washington D.C.  Dentons is structured as a Swiss Verein called Dentons Group (a Swiss Verein), which does not itself provide legal services. The verein encapsulates multiple co-operating legal entities, namely Dentons Canada LLP, Dentons Europe LLP, Dentons UK and Middle East LLP, Dentons US LLP, amongst others.

History
On 11 November 2012, SNR Denton, Salans and the Canada-based Fraser Milner Casgrain announced a three-way merger, forming a new law firm structured as a Swiss Verein and named Dentons. The partners of the three firms ratified the merger on 28 November 2012, and it was completed on 28 March 2013. Dentons opened an office in Houston, Texas in September 2013.

On January 26, 2015, Dentons announced that it was combining with a Chinese firm, Dacheng which was completed in November 2015. The new firm is called 大成 in Chinese, and  Dentons in other languages. The logo features the Chinese characters for Dacheng globally, with the lettering 大成 Dentons. Following the  combination, Dentons surpassed Baker & McKenzie and DLA Piper, the world's previous top law firms by headcount, by at least 2,500 lawyers.

In April 2015, Dentons US agreed to a merger with Atlanta-based law firm McKenna Long & Aldridge which was completed in June of that year. The firm also opened new offices in Hungary, Luxembourg and South Africa during 2015 and announced combinations with firms in Australia, Colombia, and Mexico. It also launched Nextlaw Labs, a business accelerator focused on  new technologies., in May 2015. Dentons also announced in November 2016 that it would become the first global law firm with a footprint in Central America by combining with Muñoz Global, adding offices in Panama, Nicaragua and Costa Rica operating as  Dentons Muñoz was created as the Costa Rican and Central American chapter of Dentons.

In April 2016, Dentons launched in Singapore by combining with the oldest and one of the most prestigious law firms in Singapore, Rodyk & Davidson. In December 2016, Dentons launched in Australia and Papua New Guinea by combining with leading Australian law firm Gadens. The Sydney, Perth and Port Moresby offices of Gadens joined Dentons, while the Adelaide and Brisbane offices became "associate offices" and the Melbourne office remained independent. The Gadens combination resulted in Dentons having approximately 7,600 lawyers serving 57 countries.

In 2017, Dentons merged with Scottish firm Maclay Murray & Spens.  In 2017 the firm formed a strategic alliance with opposition research firm Definers Public Affairs, dubbed 3D Global Affairs. As of April 12 of 2018, Dentons announced  partnerships in Kenya, Mauritius, Caribbean, Indonesia and Malaysia.

In 2019, Dentons combined with Bingham Greenebaum Doll (from the Midwest) and Pittsburgh-based Cohen & Grigsby. The mergers were the first in a campaign called “Operation Golden Spike”. Firms that join Golden Spike operate on a dual partnership model where lawyers remain part of their existing firms while also becoming partners of the new Dentons U.S. firm. Golden Spike is part of Dentons' plan to become the first U.S. law firm with a presence in all 20 of the largest U.S. markets.

Notable attorneys

Nicholas Allard, Dean and President of Brooklyn Law School
Ashley Bell, former advisor in the White House Office of American Innovation; partner in Dentons' policy practice
Jeff Bleich, former U.S. Ambassador to Australia
Philip Jeyaretnam , Judge of the Supreme Court of Singapore
 Scott Turow, author and lawyer

References

External links 
Dentons website

Law firms of the United Kingdom
Law firms of the United States
Law firms of Canada
Law firms established in 2013
2013 establishments in the United Kingdom
Foreign law firms with offices in the Netherlands
Foreign law firms with offices in Hong Kong